The information used to calculate values is from the Electric Power Monthly published by the U.S. Energy Information Administration. Renewable generation does not include amounts for rooftop solar; only utility scale generation from solar sources is included.

States by 2017 renewable electricity production

Source:

States by 2016 renewable electricity production
Source:

Several states, including Texas have substantially increased non hydro generation due to wind and solar additions.

States by 2015 renewable electricity production
Source:

Vermont jumps to the top as a result of the closure of Vermont Yankee.

See also 
 Renewable energy in the United States
 Electricity sector of the United States
 Growth of wind power in the United States
 List of countries by renewable electricity production
 List of U.S. states and territories by carbon dioxide emissions
 List of countries by carbon dioxide emissions
 List of countries by carbon dioxide emissions per capita

References

External links

US renewable
U.S. states
Electricity
Renewable energy in the United States
United States, electricity production from renewable sources